Dolichoderus plagiatus is a species of ant in the genus Dolichoderus. It was described by Mayr in 1870.

Distribution
The species is endemic to North America. In can be found within the borders of Canada, Mexico and the United States. In Canada, they are found in New Brunswick, Ontario and Manitoba. In the United States, it can be found in North Dakota, and it is also commonly found in North Carolina, South Carolina and Georgia.

References

External links

Dolichoderus
Hymenoptera of North America
Insects described in 1870